Aura Twarowska (born 21 November 1967 as Aurora Eleonora Avram in Lugoj, Romania) is a Romanian mezzo-soprano. She was soloist of the Romanian Opera in Timișoara (1997–2010) and at the Vienna State Opera (2007–2016).

Biography 
Twarowska dedicated herself to music when she was 6 by studying piano, mandolin and singing. After graduating from the Coriolan Brediceanu High School in Lugoj she was admitted to the Faculty of Economics of the West University in Timișoara. She kept in touch with music as a member of the Academic Choir of the Banatul Philharmonic of Timișoara, conducted by Diodor Nicoară. Once the Faculty of Music was founded in Timișoara, Twarowska resumed her studying of singing. Following postgraduate opera classes with Georgeta Stoleriu. She obtained her Master of Arts degree at the National University of Music Bucharest.

After a break that lasted several years she continued to study economic sciences at the Faculty of Economics within the Ioan Slavici University of Timișoara, specializing in accounting and management information systems. She got her Bachelors in Economics with a dissertation entitled An Analysis of Managerial and Cultural Marketing Policies Applied within the Romanian National Opera in Timișoara, thus combining her two specialties – music and economics. By uniting them again in a thesis for Grigore Constantinescu, A Vision over the Structures of the Musical Theatre from a Managerial Perspective, Twarowska earned her PhD and got the maximum of votes at the National University of Music Bucharest on 29 April 2010. Twarowska debuted on the stage of the Romanian National Opera in Timișoara in the title role of Bizet's Carmen in 1998. Her work includes other operas and even more vocal-symphonic pieces.
 
International collaborations and tours opened her way to other European theatres and subsequently led to her engagement as singer at the Vienna State Opera in 2007. Alongside this team she debuted as Marcellina in Mozart's The Marriage of Figaro in Shanghai, during the Asian tour of the Vienna State Opera in the autumn of 2007, under the baton of conductor Seiji Ozawa.
In 2018 Aura Twarowska has been awarded the Title of Corresponding Member of the 
"American Romanian Academy of Arts and Sciences".
Singing Masterclass, ICon Arts Transilvania Academy, Biertan, July 2021.

Stage appearances

Vienna State Opera 

 Giacomo Puccini – Madama Butterfly
 Richard Wagner – Die Walküre
 Pyotr Ilyich Tchaikovsky – Pique Dame
 Leoš Janáček
- Jenůfa
 Richard Strauss – Der Rosenkavalier
 Modest Mussorgsky – Boris Godunov
 Jacques Offenbach – The Tales of Hoffmann
 Vincenzo Bellini – La sonnambula
 Gioachino Rossini – Il barbiere di Siviglia
 Pyotr Ilyich Tchaikovsky – Eugene Onegin
 Pietro Mascagni – Cavalleria rusticana
 Richard Wagner – Der fliegende Holländer
 Richard Wagner – Götterdämmerung
 Gaetano Donizetti – La fille du régiment

Vienna Volksoper 

 Richard Wagner/Loriot – Wagners Ring an einem Abend

Vienna Musikverein 

 Ludwig van Beethoven – Ninth Symphony

George Enescu Festival, Bucharest 

 Wolfgang Amadeus Mozart – Krönungsmesse (2001)
 George Enescu – Œdipe, Jocasta (2003)
 Ludwig van Beethoven – Ninth Symphony (2005),conductor  Zubin Mehta

Carré Theatre, Amsterdam 

 Georges Bizet – Carmen, Carmen
 Johann Strauss II – Die Fledermaus, Orlovski

Concertgebouw, Amsterdam 

 George Frideric Handel – Messiah
 Giuseppe Verdi – Requiem

Esplanade, Singapore 

 Wolfgang Amadeus Mozart – Le nozze di Figaro, Marcellina

Graz Opera, Austria 

 Pietro Mascagni  – Cavalleria Rusticana 2018–2019

Romanian National Opera, Bucharest 

 Georges Bizet – Carmen, Carmen
 Giuseppe Verdi – Aida, Amneris; Requiem
 George Enescu – Œdipe, Jocasta, premiere

Romanian National Opera, Timișoara 

 Giuseppe Verdi – Aida, Amneris; Rigoletto, Maddalena, premiere; Otello, Emilia, premiere
 Giacomo Puccini – Madama Butterfly, Suzuki
 Georges Bizet – Carmen, Carmen

Romanian National Opera, Cluj-Napoca 

 Georges Bizet – Carmen, Carmen

Discography 
Richard Wagner – Der Ring des Nibelungen (Waltraute), Deutsche Grammophon

References

External links 
 Aura Twarowska on compendium.ro 
 Aura Twarowska on Operabase

1967 births
Living people
People from Lugoj
20th-century Romanian women opera singers
21st-century Romanian women opera singers
Operatic mezzo-sopranos